Pianura (Italian: "plain") is a western suburb of Naples, southern Italy. It is bounded on one side by the area of Soccavo and on the other side by the outskirts of the town of Pozzuoli.

Personalities
Justin Russolillo (1891-1955), presbyter
Giorgio Di Vicino (b. 1980), footballer

See also
Vocationist Fathers

Quartieri of Naples
Former municipalities of the Province of Naples